FitzGerald or Fitzgerald, is an Irish surname of Hiberno-Norman origin. It is a patronymic derived from the prefix Fitz- from the Latin filius- plus Gerald, thus meaning "son of Gerald”. In Gaelic it is rendered Mac Gearailt.

People
 Adolphus L. Fitzgerald (1840–1921), Justice of the Supreme Court of Nevada
 Alan Fitzgerald (satirist) (1935-2011), Australian journalist, satirist and politician
 Alexis FitzGerald Snr (1916–1985), Irish politician
 Alexis FitzGerald Jnr (1945-2015), Irish politician
 Alice Fitzgerald (1875–1962), American nurse
 Annie Fitzgerald (1844–1934), American landowner
 Barry Fitzgerald (1888–1961), Irish actor
 Barry Fitzgerald (investigator), paranormal investigator for SyFy Channel's Ghost Hunters International
 Brian Fitzgerald (disambiguation), multiple people
 Brinsley FitzGerald (1859–1931), British stockbroker
 Caroline Fitzgerald (1865–1911), expatriate American poet
 Casey Fitzgerald, multiple people
 Charles Fitzgerald (1791–1887), governor of Gambia; governor of Western Australia
 Charles Patrick Fitzgerald (1902–1992), scholar of China
 Ciaran Fitzgerald (born 1952), Irish rugby union player
 Dai Fitzgerald (1872–1951), Welsh international rugby player
 Deirdre FitzGerald (born 1936), Australian lawyer
 Desmond FitzGerald (politician) (1888–1947), Irish revolutionary, poet and politician
 Desmond FitzGerald, 29th Knight of Glin, president of the Irish Georgian Society
 Edmund Fitzgerald (disambiguation), multiple people
 Edward FitzGerald (disambiguation), multiple people
 Eithne FitzGerald (born 1950), Irish politician
 Ella Fitzgerald (1917–1996), U.S. jazz singer
 F. Scott Fitzgerald (1896–1940), American novelist and short story writer
 Frances FitzGerald (journalist) (born 1940), U.S. Pulitzer Prize–winning journalist
 Frances Fitzgerald (politician) (born 1950), Irish politician
 Frank Fitzgerald (1885–1939), U.S. governor of Michigan
 Frankie Fitzgerald (born 1985), British actor
 Garret FitzGerald (1926–2011), seventh Taoiseach of the Republic of Ireland
 Garret A. FitzGerald (born 1950), Irish pharmacologist
 Garrett M. Fitzgerald (1806–1859), American politician
 Gene Fitzgerald (1932–2007), Irish politician
 Gerald Fitzgerald (disambiguation), multiple people
 Geraldine Fitzgerald (1913–2005), Irish-American actress
 George FitzGerald (disambiguation), multiple people
 George FitzGerald (1851–1901), Irish physicist
 Hermione FitzGerald (1864-1895), Duchess of Leinster
 Hermione FitzGerald (born 1985), Irish professional golfer
 Jack Fitzgerald (1873–1929), founder member of the Socialist Party of Great Britain
 James FitzGerald (disambiguation), multiple people
 Jim Fitzgerald (born 1926), American businessman and philanthropist
 Joan Fitz-Gerald (born 1948), American politician
 John Fitzgerald (disambiguation), multiple people
 John F. Fitzgerald, Mayor of Boston Massachusetts and grandfather of President John Fitzgerald Kennedy
 John Fitzgerald Kennedy, United States president
 John Fitzgerald (Medal of Honor) (1873–1948), American Medal of Honor recipient
 John D. FitzGerald, Irish economist
 Joseph Fitzgerald (disambiguation), multiple people
 Judith Fitzgerald (1952–2015), Canadian poet
 Judkin-Fitzgerald baronets (Created 1801), of Lisheen, Co Tipperary, Ireland
 Karen Fitzgerald, American artist
 Kevin Fitzgerald (born 1951), U.S. veterinarian; appeared on the television programme Emergency Vets
 Kevin W. Fitzgerald (1950-2007), American politician
 Larry Fitzgerald (born 1983), American football player
 Lawrence J. Fitzgerald (died 1918), NYS Treasurer 1886–1889
 Les Fitzgerald, Scottish footballer
 Lewis Fitz-Gerald (born 1958), Australian actor and television director
 LeMoine FitzGerald (1890–1956), Canadian artist, a member of the Group of Seven
 Lorna Fitzgerald (born 1996), English actress
 Lou Fitzgerald (1919–2013), American baseball player, scout and manager
 Martin Fitzgerald (disambiguation), multiple people
 Maurice FitzGerald  (d. 1176), (Anglo Norman) baron, progenitor of the famous Geraldines.
 Meryle Fitzgerald (1925–2004), All-American Girls Professional Baseball League ballplayer
 Michael Fitzgerald (disambiguation), multiple people
 Nick Fitzgerald (born 1996), American football player
 Pamela Fitzgerald (camogie) (born 1984), Irish camogie player
 Pat Fitzgerald (born 1974), U.S. football coach
 Paudie Fitzgerald (1933–2020), Irish cyclist
 Patrick Fitzgerald (born 1960), U.S. attorney; special prosecutor in the CIA leak scandal
 Penelope Fitzgerald (1916–2000), British poet, novelist and biographer
 Percy Hetherington Fitzgerald (1834–1925), Anglo-Irish author and critic 
 Peter Fitzgerald (disambiguation), multiple people
 Robert Fitzgerald (disambiguation), multiple people
 Ryan Fitzgerald (born 1976), Australian television presenter
 Sarah Fitz-Gerald (born 1968), Australian women's squash player
 Scott Fitzgerald (disambiguation), multiple people
 Susan Fitzgerald (1949–2013), Irish actress
 Stephen FitzGerald (born 1938), Australian ambassador, diplomat
 Tara Fitzgerald (born 1967), British actress
 Thomas Fitzgerald (disambiguation), multiple people
 Tom Fitzgerald (disambiguation), multiple people
 William Fitzgerald (disambiguation), multiple people
 Zelda Fitzgerald (1900–1948), wife of F. Scott Fitzgerald

Fictional
 Penny Fitzgerald, character from The Amazing World of Gumball

 Martin Fitzgerald, character from Without a Trace
 Jeremy Fitzgerald, character from the Five Nights at Freddy's franchise

See also
 FitzGerald dynasty

References

Surnames of Irish origin
Norman-language surnames
Surnames of Norman origin
Patronymic surnames
Surnames from given names